Star Stage is a half-hour American television anthology series that began on September 9, 1955, and ended on September 7, 1956.  

It was sponsored on alternate weeks by Chesebrough-Ponds and Campbell Soup Company and hosted by Jeffrey Lynn, who became host on the November 18 telecast. Thirty-nine episodes aired on NBC.  Approximately two-thirds of the episodes were done live and the remainder were filmed. Filmed episodes were produced by Revue. Some episodes originated from WRCA-TV in New York City, and others came from KRCA-TV in Los Angeles. When the program debuted, it was carried live on 31 stations and by delayed broadcast on 12.

Guest stars included: Mary Astor, Ralph Bellamy, Polly Bergen, Ward Bond, Eddie Bracken, Rod Cameron, Wendell Corey, Joseph Cotten, Jeanne Crain, Paul Douglas, Dan Duryea, Joan Fontaine, Greer Garson, Betty Grable, Lorne Greene, Dennis Morgan, Sylvia Sidney, Jack Whiting, Cornel Wilde, and Alan Young.

Mort Abrahams was the executive producer, and Charles Russell was the initial producer, In March 1956, S. Mark Smith was named producer. Directors included feature film directors, Robert Stevenson, Sidney Lanfield, Felix E. Feist, and Don Weis.

Episodes

References

External links
Star Stage at CVTA with episode list

1950s American anthology television series
1955 American television series debuts
1956 American television series endings
American live television series
Black-and-white American television shows
NBC original programming